= 1999 Civic Democratic Party leadership election =

Czech political party election

- 5 December 1999
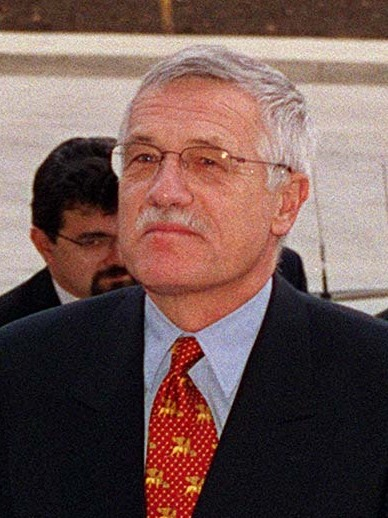
Candidate	Václav Klaus
Electoral vote	215
Percentage	81.1%
Leader of ODS before election
Václav Klaus
Elected Leader of ODS
Václav Klaus

A leadership election for the Civic Democratic Party (ODS) was held in the Czech Republic on 5 December 1999. Václav Klaus was confirmed as the party's leader. With strong support from regions, he was the only candidate. Ivan Langer and Dagmar Lastovecká were offered the chance to stand but they declined.

== Results ==
Candidate	Votes	%
Václav Klaus	215	81.13
Against	50	18.87
Total	265	100
